Clinical cardiac electrophysiology (also referred to as cardiac electrophysiology, arrhythmia services, or electrophysiology), is a branch of the medical specialty of cardiology and is concerned with the study and treatment of rhythm disorders of the heart. Cardiologists with expertise in this area are usually referred to as electrophysiologists.  Electrophysiologists are trained in the mechanism, function, and performance of the electrical activities of the heart.  Electrophysiologists work closely with other cardiologists and cardiac surgeons to assist or guide therapy for heart rhythm disturbances (arrhythmias). They are trained to perform interventional and surgical procedures to treat cardiac arrhythmia.

The training required to become an electrophysiologist is lengthy and requires eight years after medical school (in the U.S.), entailing three years of internal medicine residency, three years of clinical cardiology fellowship, and two years of clinical cardiac electrophysiology. This is necessary due to the significant complexity of patients that electrophysiologists usually treat, the constant advances in methods and equipment used in their daily practice, making the field of electrophysiology one of the most demanding subspecialties of modern medicine.

An electrophysiology study is any of a number of invasive (intracardiac) and non-invasive recording of spontaneous electrical activity, as well as of cardiac responses to programmed electrical stimulation. These studies are performed to assess arrhythmias, elucidate symptoms, evaluate abnormal electrocardiograms, assess risk of developing arrhythmias in the future, and design treatment.

In addition to diagnostic testing of the electrical properties of the heart, electrophysiologists are trained in therapeutic and surgical methods to treat many of the rhythm disturbances of the heart.  Therapeutic modalities employed in this field include antiarrhythmic drug therapy and surgical implantation of pacemakers and implantable cardioverter-defibrillators.

Scope of practice, tests and procedures

Diagnostic testing
 Ambulatory electrocardiographic monitoring - Holter and event monitor recording and interpretation;
 Tilt table testing;
 T-wave alternans testing;
 Signal-averaged electrocardiogram (SAECG) interpretation, also referred to as "late potentials" reading;
 Electrophysiology study (EPS) consists in the insertion of pacing and recording electrodes either in the esophagus (intra-esophageal EPS) or, through blood vessels, directly into the heart chambers (intra-cardiac EPS) in order to measure electrical properties of the heart and, in the case of intra-cardiac EPS, to electrically stimulate it in the attempt to induce arrhythmias for diagnostic purposes ("programmed electrical stimulation").

Medical treatment
Initial administration and monitoring of the effect of drugs for treatment of heart rhythm disorders. Electrophysiologists are often involved when severe or life-threatening arrhythmias are being treated, or when multiple drugs must be used to treat an arrhythmia.
Antiarrhythmic agents are commonly used to try to control rhythms.

Catheter ablation
 Ablation therapy - Catheter based ablation of lesions in the heart (with radiofrequency energy, cryotherapy (destructive freezing), microwave, or ultrasound energy) to cure or control arrhythmias (see radiofrequency ablation). Ablation is usually performed during the same procedure as the electrophysiology study during which arrhythmias are attempted to be induced as well as elucidating the mechanism of the arrhythmia for which ablation therapy is sought.
 "Non-complex" ablations include ablation for arrhythmias such as: AV nodal reentrant tachycardia, accessory pathway mediated tachycardia, CTI-dependent atrial flutter. These procedures are usually performed using intracardiac catheters (as are used during an electrophysiology study), fluoroscopy (a real-time X-ray camera), and electrical recordings from the inside of the heart.
 "Complex" ablations include ablation for arrhythmias such as multifocal atrial tachycardia, atrial fibrillation, and ventricular tachycardia. In addition to the apparatus used for a "non-complex" ablation, these procedures often make use of sophisticated electro-anatomic mapping systems to localize the source of the abnormal rhythm and to direct delivery of ablation lesions. Additionally, most of our current electro-anatomic mapping systems have the ability to integrate CT or MR images of the heart to allow electrical activity to be superimposed on anatomic structures.

Surgical procedures: pacemaker and defibrillator implantation and follow up
 Implantation of single and dual chamber pacemakers and defibrillators
 Implantation of subcutaneous defibrillators
 Implantation of leadless pacemakers
 Implantation of "biventricular" pacemakers and defibrillators for patients with congestive heart failure
 Implantation of loop recorders (implanted ECG recorders for long-term monitoring of ECG to allow for diagnosis of an arrhythmia)
 Implantation of left atrial appendage occlusion devices
 Extraction and removal of pacemakers, defibrillators, and loop recorders
 Clinical follow up and reprogramming of implanted devices

See also
 Cardiology
 Cardiac arrhythmia
 Cardiac electrophysiology
 Electroanatomic mapping

Cardiac electrophysiology